Robert Lockhart may refer to:

 Robert Douglas Lockhart (1894–1987), Scottish anatomist
 Sir R. H. Bruce Lockhart (1887–1970), British journalist, author, and secret agent
 Sir Rob Lockhart (1893–1981), British general, Commander in Chief of the Indian Army, and scout movement notable
 Bob Lockhart, Canadian politician and mayor of Saint John, New Brunswick
 Bob Lockhart (footballer) (1940–2010), Australian rules footballer
 Robert Lockhart (composer), pianist and composer; see Louisa Young